Our Lady of Fatima Shrine is a place of worship for Catholic Christians in Krishnagiri, Tamil Nadu, India. The church also served as the parish church for Krishnagiri. This church was constructed in 1972 due to the insufficient space of the existing Ignatius Church which is located in Oldpet, Krishnagiri. The  Fatima Mary statue inside the church is from Fátima, Portugal. Every year on the second Sunday of July, the church celebrates a feast which is very famous in the town. In this church, Tamil is the medium of preaching. This church is affiliated with the  Dharmapuri Diocese.

History
There are two histories of this church. Before this church was built, people in Krishnagiri used St. Ignatius Of Loyala church as their parish church until 1972.

History of St. Ignatius Of Loyala Church
During the 18th century Krishnagiri is military headquarter of Bharamahal under  Mysore Kingdom. By 1786 British conquered this Bharamahal from Tippu Sultan after Third Anglo-Mysore War, this made Catholic from Elathagiri and  Veppanahalli settled in Krishnagiri. With the help of British soldiers, a small chapel was built, named after  Loyola Ignatius. During that time, Paris M.E.P congregation took care of all the church services in Southern India so, this church also come under M.E.P priest service.

After British soldiers moved out from Krishnagiri in 1832, Rev Fr. Abe Dubey was in-charge of  Elathagiri church and this church. During his time a small church was built next to the chapel. Till 1857 Krishnagiri was part of  Thrupattur and Vellore parish. Later in 1897 Krishnagiri church became a part of  Elathagiri Parish. According to the book of "Saruthira Surukam", which published by Salem diocese, around 50 to 60 Catholics lived in Krishnagiri during 1897.

In 1925 Elathagiri Parish priest Rev. Fr. Dominic built a third church (present church), next to the existing church which was built over the old chapel. On 17 July 1925 the first mass was preached in this church. Then in 1930 Salem Diocese was created from Kudandhai Diocese (Kumbakonam). By this time Krishnagiri church became a parish under Salem Diocese and Fr. Gabrial became first Parish Priest of Krishnagiri. On 12 January 1933 Rev. Fr. Gabrial died in Krishnagiri, as per his request he was buried in Kumbakonom Diosis Church. As per Salem bishop's request, sisters from Marian Franciscan came to Krishnagiri and started their service on 29 November 1934 in this church

Till 1972 this church served as the Parish church of Krishnagiri. The masses in this church were stopped after the new Fatima Church started its service, and gradually the church was abandoned. Later by the help of Chinappa Mudiyalar family and Rev. Fr. Madulai Muthu, this church was renovated and started used occasionally. Later in 2017 this church was reconstructed and reopened for the public in 13 Aug 2017. Till now, every Monday evening at 6:30 mass is conducted in this church.

History of Our Lady of Fatima Church
During 1930 Rev Fr. Gabriel brought 3.04 acres of land from Rayapan Mudhilayar. By 1940 Rev. Fr. Washone built Pharish Priest House. During 1950 due to increase of Krishnagiri catholic population, and also due to space insufficiency, Rev.Fr Kulandhai Nadhar planned to build a new church for Krishnagiri. Then with the approval and blessing of Salem bishop Venmani Vendhar, construction of this church was started with the help of public funds and actor Chandrababu's donation. After the sudden death of Rev. Fr. Kulandhai Naadhar on 11.3.1963. Rev. Fr. Issac finished the construction of this church. By the blessing of Salem Bishop 11.9.1972 first mass was conducted at this church. In 1997 Dharamapuri Diocese was established from Salem Diocese, since then this church serves under Dharamapuri Diocese.

Sub-Station Churches

List of Parish Priest

Also See
Roman Catholic Diocese of Dharmapuri
Vinnarasi Madha Church, Kandikuppam
Our Lady Of Refuge Church, Elathagiri
St. Antony's Church, Sundampatti

References

Buildings and structures in Tamil Nadu
Roman Catholic churches in Tamil Nadu
Churches in Krishnagiri District